The Fussball Club Basel 1893 1981–82 season was their 88th season since the club was founded. It was their 36th consecutive season in the top flight of Swiss football after they won promotion during the season 1945–46. They played their home games in the St. Jakob Stadium. Pierre Jacques Lieblich was club chairman for the second year running.

Overview

Pre-season
Helmut Benthaus was first-team manager for the seventeenth consecutive season. During the off-season four players left the squad, Ernst Schleiffer moved on to Grenchen, Peter Marti to Aarau, Markus Tanner to Luzern and Joseph Küttel moved on to Lugano. During the season Hansruedi Schär was loaned out to Nordstern Basel and during the winter break Detlev Lauscher moved on to Luzern. In the other direction goalkeeper Walter Eichenberger joined from Young Boys and defender Bruno Graf joined from Chiasso. Basel also signed two youngsters, Alfred Lüthi from FC Subingen and Beat Sutter joined from local club FC Gelterkinden. The biggest transfer this summer was that of former West German international Harald Nickel from Borussia Mönchengladbach.

Basel played a total of 54 games in their 1981–82 season. 30 matches were played in the domestic league, six in the Swiss Cup, three in the Swiss League Cup, five in the Cup of the Alps and 10 were friendly matches. The team scored a total of 101 goals and conceded 80. Of their 10 test games, six were won and four ended with a defeat. Five of these games were played at home in St. Jakob Stadium and five were played away.

Domestic league
Basel played in the 1981–82 Nationalliga A. The league championship format was expanded from the 1980–81 season to include sixteen teams and the last two teams were to be relegated. Basel ended the season in eighth position, 21 points behind Grasshopper Club who became champions. In their 30 league games Basel won eleven, drew six and lost thirteen matches, which meant that the totaled 28 points. They scored 47 goals, conceding 51. Local rivals Nordstern Basel and Chiasso finished in the last two slots and suffered relegation.

Swiss Cup
Basel entered into the Swiss Cup in the round of 64. Here they were drawn away against Sursee and on 26 September they won the match, 9–1. In the round of 32 they were drawn away against Bellinzona and this match was on 31 October and Basel won, 1–0. In the round of 16 they were drawn away from home against Aarau on 30 March 1982 and this match was won, 3–2. In the quarterfinal Basel played at home against Lausanne-Sport and this ended with a 2–1 victory. The semi-final was played on 4 May in the St. Jakob Stadium against SR Delémont and Basel won 3–0. In the Final, played in the Wankdorf Stadium, was against Sion. After a free kick on the sideline, in the 21st minute, a headed goal from Alain Balet secured Sion the trophy.

Swiss League Cup
In first round of the Swiss League Cup Basel were also drawn at home against Young Boys and a 1–0 victory took them to the next round. Here they played away against Grenchen and came away with a 2–1 victory. In the quarterfinal Basel played on the Stadion Brügglifeld but were eliminated by Aarau.

Coppa delle Alpi
Basel were not qualified to play any of the European competitions, but they did enter the Coppa delle Alpi. They played together with Lausanne-Sport in Group A against Bordeaux and Bastia. Basel won the group and continued to the final, which was played on 29 September 1981 in Basel against Sochaux. They game ended 2–2 after extra time and Basel won on penalties.

Players 
The following is the list of the Basel first team squad during the season 1981–92. The list includes players that were in the squad the day the Nationalliga A season started on 15 August 1981 but subsequently left the club after that date.

 

 

 

 
 
 

 

 

 
 

 

 
 
 
 

Players who left the squad

Results 
Legend

Friendly matches

Pre- and mid-season

Winter break

Nationalliga A

Nationalliga Matches

League standings

Swiss Cup

Swiss League Cup

Coppa delle Alpi

Group A

NB: teams did not play compatriots

Group table

NB: 1 bonus point awarded for victory by 3 or more goals

Final

See also 
 History of FC Basel
 List of FC Basel players
 List of FC Basel seasons

References

Sources 
 Rotblau: Jahrbuch Saison 2015/2016. Publisher: FC Basel Marketing AG. 
 Die ersten 125 Jahre. Publisher: Josef Zindel im Friedrich Reinhardt Verlag, Basel. 
 The FCB squad 1981–82 at fcb-archiv.ch
 Switzerland 1981–82 at RSSSF
 Swiss League Cup at RSSSF
 Cup of the Alps 1981 at RSSSF

External links
 FC Basel official site

FC Basel seasons
Basel